Erich Berko (born 6 September 1994) is a German professional footballer who plays for  club Hallescher as a forward or as a winger.

Club career
Born in Ostfildern, Berko made his professional debut on 28 January 2012 for VfB Stuttgart II in the 3. Liga against FC Rot-Weiß Erfurt.

On 7 May 2013, Berko extended his contract with VfB Stuttgart until June 2015.

On 31 January 2022, Berko signed with Sandhausen.

On 2 February 2023, Berko joined Hallescher in 3. Liga until the end of the 2022–23 season.

International career
Berko played for Germany at the 2011 European U-17 Championship.

Career statistics

References

External links
 Erich Berko at uefa.com
 Erich Berko at VfB-Stuttgart.de 
 Erich Berko at kicker.de 

Living people
1994 births
People from Ostfildern
Sportspeople from Stuttgart (region)
German footballers
VfB Stuttgart II players
Dynamo Dresden players
SV Darmstadt 98 players
SV Sandhausen players
Maccabi Netanya F.C. players
Hallescher FC players
2. Bundesliga players
3. Liga players
Israeli Premier League players
German expatriate footballers
Expatriate footballers in Israel
German expatriate sportspeople in Israel
Germany youth international footballers
Footballers from Baden-Württemberg
German sportspeople of Ghanaian descent
Association football forwards